Ed Waterstreet (born May 5, 1943 in Algoma, Wisconsin) is a Deaf American actor and the founder and artistic director of Deaf West Theatre, which was established in 1991, and was the first resident theatre company in America operating under the direction of a deaf artistic director.

Waterstreet has acted in a few films such as Love Is Never Silent (1985) and Sweet Nothing in My Ear (2008).

Personal life 
Since 1970, he has been married to Linda Bove, best known for her role as "Linda the Librarian" from Sesame Street.

References

External links
 Ed Waterstreet, website
 Deaf West Theatre, Official website
 Ed Waterstreet Image at Life magazine

1943 births
Living people
Artistic directors
American male deaf actors
American male film actors
American theatre managers and producers
American deaf people
People from Algoma, Wisconsin